A balloon glow or night glow is an event that is often held as a climax to a hot air balloon festival.  The balloons are set up at sunset in the launch area, an open field, or a football stadium and are inflated as if they are going to take off, but instead of being allowed to ascend, they are held down by the ground crew.  The propane burners are ignited periodically to keep the balloons inflated with hot air.

Since the event typically occurs in the dark, the balloons glow like huge light bulbs or Chinese lanterns, giving a spectacular display for the audience.  Sometimes the event is judged and sometimes it is held merely for entertainment and the celebration of ballooning.

Gallery

References

See also 

Hot Air Balloon Festivals

Balloons (aeronautics)
Ballooning